Spike and Dru: Pretty Maids All in a Row is an original novel based on the U.S. television series Buffy the Vampire Slayer. Voodoo Lounge, found in Tales of the Slayer Volume III, is a companion to this story.

Plot summary

It is 1940 and for Drusilla's vampiric birthday, Spike decides he will acquire Freyja's Strand for her. The strand, a necklace, has the ability to allow Drusilla to view her reflection. After a dangerous trek, Spike and Drusilla strike a deal with the ice demon Skrymir: should Spike and Drusilla destroy all the current Slayers-in-waiting as well as the current Slayer, he will fork over the necklace. Up to the challenge, Spike and Drusilla acquire a list of the Slayers-in-waiting from the Watcher's Council in London and ravage the Earth, killing girls hideously as they go.

Meanwhile, the current Slayer, Sophie, is alerted to the situation and sent off with her watcher, Yanna, to rescue the remaining Slayers-in-waiting. Unfortunately Yanna has developed an unhealthy obsession with Spike and cannot fight against him when there is a run-in between the two groups. But Sophie rescues a decent numbers of the girls and has them brought to the council headquarters. Sophie leaves to retrieve the last girl and runs into Spike and Drusilla in Denmark who capture her Watcher. While Sophie hunts down the duo, Skrymir has grown impatient and manifests himself inside the Council headquarters where he wreaks havoc on the inhabitants. The Council must find a way to stop Skrymir from killing all the Slayers-in-waiting (which was thought to end the line of Slayers) while the Slayer herself tries to track down her Watcher who may already be dead.

Buffyverse canon
The book's plotline foreshadows the "potentials" used throughout Buffy season 7.

See also

Spike comics
Old Times
Spike vs Dracula
Old Wounds
Lost and Found
Spike & Dru
Asylum

Spike novels
Blackout
Pretty Maids All in a Row
Spark and Burn

External links

Reviews
Litefoot1969.bravepages.com - Review of this book by Litefoot
Teen-books.com - Reviews of this book
Nika-summers.com - Review of this book by Nika Summers
Shadowcat.name - Review of this book
Teenreads.com - Review of this book

2001 novels
Books based on Buffy the Vampire Slayer
Fiction set in 1940